Mody University of Science and Technology, formerly Mody University, is a private women's university located in Lakshmangarh in the state of Rajasthan, India. It was established in 1998 by Mr R.P. Mody, an industrialist and philanthropist.

Admissions
The admission is based on MU-SAT (Mody University Scholarship cum Admission test)/All India Rank/ State level Tests.

Academics
The institute offers undergraduate programs leading to a Bachelor of Technology, Bachelor of Arts, Bachelor of Architecture, Bachelor of Design, Bachelor of Commerce, Bachelor of Science degree and postgraduate programs leading to Master of Technology, Master of Arts, Master of Commerce, Master of Science degree.

Faculties
Mody University has six faculties. Each faculty has its own administration structure:
School of Sciences
School of Engineering and Technology
School of Legal Studies
School of Management Studies
School of Fashion and Design
School of Liberal Arts

Campus
The campus is spread over an area of over  full of greenery with a wide variety of trees and other plants. In a survey 96 species of birds (certified by an ornithologist from WWF-India) and 16 species of butterflies (certified by lepidopterists from WWF-India) have been identified.

The large campus has a beautiful meditation structure by the name of 'Tapovan' and a Students Auditorium for student's extracurricular activities. Along with these, the campus also has a beautiful Student's Mess for hostelers. The student's mess is Asia's second-largest with 1800 dining capacity.

Student life
Mody University provides on-campus residential facilities to its students, research scholars, faculty members, and many of its staff. The institute has sports facilities for indoor as well as outdoor games. Sports facilities include yoga, equestrian, running tracks, pole vault, high jump, long and triple jump, tennis court, cricket, hockey, football, volleyball, basketball, badminton, table tennis, carom, chess.

Spirituality
'Tapovan' is an on-site facility that encompasses a 'Yagna-Shala', a meditation hall and a temple spread over 8 acres. At Yagna-Shala, 7 different kinds of Yagnas are performed from 6 a.m. to 7 a.m.; each for the seven days of the week.
The temple remains open from 5 a.m. to 11 a.m. and from 5 p.m. to 8:30 p.m. Grand celebrations are organized on the occasions of Ram Navmi, Janmashtami, Diwali, and other major festivals.  The meditation hall, with a sitting arrangement for around 200 people, is open for everyone. Yoga classes are conducted regularly. Academic courses in Sanskrit and Vedic Astrology are offered for students who wish to pursue higher education in this sphere.

References
 http://www.modyuniversity.ac.in/cad

External links 
 Official Web Page
 School of Engineering & Technology
 School of Arts Science & Commerce 
 School of Business Economics and Management
 School of Law and Governance 
 College of Architecture & Design
 Mody School - Sister organization of Mody University

Women's engineering colleges in India
Engineering colleges in Rajasthan
Women's universities and colleges in Rajasthan
Education in Sikar district
Educational institutions established in 1998
1998 establishments in Rajasthan